The Sheads House, also known as Oak Ridge Seminary, is a historic home located at Gettysburg in Adams County, Pennsylvania. It was built in 1862, and is a -story, "T"-shaped  brick dwelling in the Gothic Revival style. It sits on a granite foundation and has a cross gable roof. It features an ornamental fascia board and porches with ornamental balustrades.  Shortly after it was built it housed Oak Ridge Seminary, a girls' school.  During the Battle of Gettysburg, it was used as a hospital for Confederate States Army wounded.

It was listed on the National Register of Historic Places in 1976. It is located in the Gettysburg Battlefield Historic District.

See also
National Register of Historic Places listings in Adams County, Pennsylvania

References

Houses on the National Register of Historic Places in Pennsylvania
Gothic Revival architecture in Pennsylvania
Houses completed in 1862
Houses in Adams County, Pennsylvania
1862 establishments in Pennsylvania
National Register of Historic Places in Adams County, Pennsylvania